Robert Henry (R. H.) Charles,  (Cookstown, 6 August 1855–Westminster, 1931) was an Irish Anglican theologian, biblical scholar, professor, and translator from Northern Ireland. He is known particularly for his English translations of numerous apocryphal and pseudepigraphal Ancient Hebrew writings, including the Book of Jubilees (1895), the Apocalypse of Baruch (1896), the Ascension of Isaiah (1900), the Book of Enoch (1906), and the Testaments of the Twelve Patriarchs (1908), which have been widely used. He wrote the articles in the eleventh edition of Encyclopædia Britannica (1911) attributed to the initials "R. H. C."

He was born in Cookstown, County Tyrone, on 6 August 1855 and educated at the Belfast Academy, Queen's College, Belfast, and Trinity College, Dublin, with periods in Imperial Germany and Switzerland. He gained a D.D. and became Professor of Biblical Greek at the Trinity College. In 1906, he was elected Fellow of the British Academy and four years later he was appointed Fellow of the Merton College, Oxford.
He also became Archdeacon of Westminster in 1919, serving until his death in 1931. He is buried in Westminster Abbey

Source "Queens University Belfast Collections & Archives " R H Charles married,  Mary Lilias 1886...having no children.

Select bibliography
  The Book of Enoch, Oxford: Clarendon, 1893, reprinted in 1895. Republished by Boston, MA: Samuel Weiser; 2003. 
  The Ethiopic Version of the Hebrew Book of Jubilees, Oxford: Clarendon, 1895.
 The Apocalypse of Baruch, London: Black, 1896.
    and W. R. Morfill, The Book of the Secrets of Enoch, Oxford: Clarendon, 1896. Republished by Filiquarian Publishing, 2006.  
  The Assumption of Moses, London: Black, 1897.
  A Critical History of the Doctrine of a Future Life, London: Black, 1899. 1999 reprint of 2nd edition
  Ascension of Isaiah, London: Black, 1900.
  The Book of Jubilees or the Little Genesis, London: Black, 1902.
  Encyclopaedia Biblica (contributor), 1903
  The Ethiopic Version of Book of Enoch, Oxford: Clarendon, 1906.
  The Greek Versions of the Testaments of the Twelve Patriarchs, Oxford: Clarendon, 1908.
  trans. The Testaments of the Twelve Patriarchs), London: Adam and Charles Black, 1908.
  The Book of Enoch or 1 Enoch: Translated from the Editor's Ethiopic Text, Oxford: Clarendon, 1912.
  Fragments of a Zadokite Work. Translated from the Cambridge Hebrew Text and edited with Introduction, Notes, and Indexes, Oxford: Clarendon Press, 1912.
  Studies in the Apocalypse, Edinburgh: T. & T. Clark, 1913.
  Eschatology: The Doctrine of a Future Life in Israel, Judaism and Christianity, London: Black, 1913 (rpt. New York: Schocken 1963 with an introduction by G. W. Buchanan).
  ed. The Apocrypha and Pseudepigrapha of the Old Testament, 2 vols.; Oxford: Clarendon, 1913. Republished in 1976. 
   Religious Development Between the Old and the New Testaments, William and Norgate, 1914. Republished in 1925. 
 
  Lectures on the Apocalypse, Schweich Lecture for 1919.
  A Critical and Exegetical Commentary on the Revelation of St. John, 2 vols., Edinburgh: Clark, 1920.
  The Teaching of the New Testament on Divorce, London: Williams & Norgate, 1921
  A Critical and Exegetical Commentary on the Book of Daniel, Oxford: Clarendon, 1929.

References

  T. W. Manson, "Charles, Robert Henry," in The Dictionary of National Biography, 1931–40, ed. L. G. Wickham Legg, Oxford: Oxford University Press, 1949, pp. 169–70.
 "Concise Dictionary of National Biography"

External links

 
 

1855 births
1931 deaths
19th-century British biblical scholars
20th-century British non-fiction writers
20th-century English theologians
20th-century Irish non-fiction writers
Alumni of Queen's University Belfast
Alumni of Trinity College Dublin
Anglican biblical scholars
Anglican priests from Northern Ireland
Archdeacons of Westminster
Bible commentators
Canons of Westminster
English Anglican theologians
English Freemasons
Fellows of the British Academy
Ge'ez language
Greek–English translators
Irish Anglican theologians
Irish biblical scholars
Irish Freemasons
People educated at the Belfast Royal Academy
People from Cookstown
Translators of the Bible into English
Fellows of Merton College, Oxford